is a second class airport located  south southwest of Takamatsu, Kagawa, Japan. The airport primarily handles domestic flights, with a small number of international flights also originating at Takamatsu.

It is equipped with an Instrument Landing System, VHF Omni-directional Radio Range, Distance Measuring Equipment, Airport Surveillance Radar, approach lights, precision approach angle guidance lights, and more.

On January 16, 2013, an All Nippon Airways Boeing 787 (Flight NH692) made an emergency landing at Takamatsu after reporting a battery problem in flight. That aircraft was flying to Haneda Airport during that incident.

Most flights that arrive and depart from Takamatsu Airport are ANA (All Nippon Airways) and Japan Airlines (JAL) planes. Both airlines transport passengers mainly from Takamatsu airport to Tokyo International airport (Haneda Airport). However, other airlines such as Asiana Airlines transport passengers to airports like Incheon International Airport.

Japan Airlines uses 737-800 aircraft, while ANA uses 787-8, 767-300, and Airbus A321neo aircraft on domestic flights to Tokyo. International carriers are seen using narrow-body aircraft on their routes.

Terminal
Takamatsu Airport has one terminal/concourse consisting of four main gates.  The first three gates are used primarily by All Nippon Airways and Japan Airlines.  The other gate is primarily for international flights and is connected to the international side of the lobby via an escalator up to the security checkpoint.  However, the international and domestic sides of the terminal are not separated.

Shops are located on the first and second floors including restaurants and cafes.  An outdoor observation deck is located on the 3rd floor directly overlooking the four main gates.

Entrances to the terminal are located on the first floor in front of the drop off lanes.  The drop off lanes also connects to the main parking area of Takamatsu Airport.

Airlines and destinations

Statistics

Access

Buses

References

External links
 Takamatsu Airport official website

Transport in Kagawa Prefecture
Airports in Japan
Buildings and structures in Kagawa Prefecture
Takamatsu, Kagawa